Félix Mantilla Lamela (born July 29, 1934) is a Puerto Rican former professional baseball utility player, who appeared mostly as an infielder. In his 11-year Major League Baseball (MLB) career, Mantilla played for the Milwaukee Braves (1956–61), New York Mets (1962), Boston Red Sox (1963–65), and Houston Astros (1966). He played second base the majority of his big league career (326 games), but also adeptly played shortstop (180), third base (143), outfield (156) and (in the latter part of his career), first base (16). Mantilla batted and threw right-handed.

In 1953, Mantilla (along with Hank Aaron and career minor league outfielder Horace Garner) joined the Class-A Minor League Baseball (MiLB) Jacksonville Braves, of the South Atlantic League — which was (at that time) one of the first two integrated baseball teams in the Southern United States. (Mantilla and Aaron were roommates. In 1954, Aaron became the MLB Braves’ left fielder when Bobby Thomson broke his ankle. Mantilla joined the major league club two seasons later.) Both Mantilla and Aaron were vital contributors to Milwaukee winning the 1957 World Series title over the New York Yankees.

During the 1962 Winter Meetings, he was traded to the Boston Red Sox for Pumpsie Green, Tracy Stallard, and Al Moran.

Mantilla's numbers improved dramatically in the hitter-friendly Fenway Park: batting average of .315 in 66 games; .289 with 30 home runs (five fewer than he had hit in his career prior to that season); a career-high with 92 RBI. That season, he was also named to the American League (AL) All-Star team for the only time in his career. As the starting second baseman, he went hitless in two at-bats before being replaced by Bobby Richardson.

Prior to the start of the  season, the Red Sox traded Mantilla to the Houston Astros for Eddie Kasko. Mantilla spent that year as a utility player before being released on November 28, 1966.

The Chicago Cubs signed Mantilla as a free agent before the start of the  season; however, during spring training he suffered an Achilles tendon injury that required surgery. Mantilla never played a game for them and was released on July 6. He went to spring training with the Cubs in 1968 as a non-roster player; at the end of camp the Cubs signed him to a minor league contract, but he never appeared in another professional game.

Looking upon Mantilla‘s major league career stat line, he posed solid numbers, including a lifetime batting average of .261, with 89 home runs, and 330 RBI.

On May 26, 1959, in the 13th inning of a game against the Pittsburgh Pirates at Milwaukee County Stadium, Mantilla ruined Harvey Haddix's bid for a perfect game. Leading off the inning, he hit a ground ball to third baseman Don Hoak, whose throw to first pulled Rocky Nelson off the bag for an error. (Mantilla had not even been in the starting lineup; he entered the game in the 11th after Del Rice had pinch-hit for Johnny O'Brien.)  Mantilla was sacrificed to second by Eddie Mathews, followed by an intentional walk to Hank Aaron. The following batter, Joe Adcock, hit one over the right-center field wall, just beyond the reach of right fielder Joe Christopher (who was making his Major League debut), for an apparent 3–0 victory. Mantilla scored the winning run, but Aaron, thinking the ball was still in play and that the game ended when Mantilla scored the winning run, rounded second and then headed for the dugout. Adcock, running out his home run, passed Aaron on the bases; as a result, the ruling from National League (NL) president Warren Giles was that Adcock's hit was a double (not a home run), only Mantilla's run counted and the final score was 1–0.

Mantilla's Topps 1962 baseball card was featured in the 2000 film Skipped Parts as the top card in a stack being thrown into a fire as part of a right of passage/growing up event between a stern grandfather (R. Lee Ermey) and his grandson (Bug Hall).

See also
 List of Major League Baseball players from Puerto Rico

References

External links

Félix Mantilla at SABR (Baseball BioProject)

1934 births
Living people
American League All-Stars
Boston Red Sox players
Evansville Braves players
Houston Astros players
Jacksonville Braves players
Major League Baseball infielders
Major League Baseball outfielders
Major League Baseball players from Puerto Rico
Milwaukee Braves players
New York Mets players
People from Isabela, Puerto Rico
Sacramento Solons players
Toledo Sox players